Master Hands is a 1936 sponsored documentary film short which shows what work is like in a Chevrolet automobile factory. It was produced by the Jam Handy Organization, a pioneer in industrial film production.

Credits 
Notables for this film include original music by Samuel Benavie, cinematography by Gordon Avil, and film editing by Vincent Herman.

Legacy
In 1999, Master Hands was selected for preservation in the United States National Film Registry by the Library of Congress as being "culturally, historically, or aesthetically significant".

See also
Jam Handy
Industrial film
Prelinger Archives

References

External links
Master Hands essay  by Richard Marback and Jim Brown on the National Film Registry website 

Master Hands essay by Daniel Eagan in America's Film Legacy: The Authoritative Guide to the Landmark Movies in the National Film Registry, A&C Black, 2010 , pages 256-258 
Master Hands at the Internet Archive:
4K Complete
Part 1
Part 2
Part 3
Part 4

1936 documentary films
1936 films
United States National Film Registry films
Black-and-white documentary films
Sponsored films
American documentary films
Chevrolet
Documentary films about automobiles
Jam Handy Organization films
Articles containing video clips
American black-and-white films
Promotional films
1930s English-language films
1930s American films